The James Peak Wilderness is a U.S. Wilderness Area in north central Colorado in the Arapaho and Roosevelt national forests. The wilderness area borders Indian Peaks Wilderness to the north and the James Peak Protection Area to the west.

Geography
The wilderness area encompasses  immediately east of the Continental Divide in Gilpin County and Clear Creek County. The wilderness is named after its second tallest mountain,  James Peak. Within its boundaries are 30 miles (48 km) of trails.

History
The wilderness was established by H.R.1576 in the 107th Congress (2001). James Peak was named after Edwin James, pioneer and botanist. Originally Pikes Peak was named James Peak prior to Pike's exploration journey. After the renaming to Pikes Peak, the current James Peak was named.

References

Protected areas of Clear Creek County, Colorado
Protected areas of Gilpin County, Colorado
IUCN Category Ib
Wilderness areas of Colorado
Protected areas established in 2001
Arapaho National Forest
Roosevelt National Forest
2001 establishments in Colorado